Goossens is a Dutch-language patronymic surname meaning "son of Goos/Goossen" (Goswin). It is the 8th most common name in Belgium. Notable people with the surname include:

Ben Goossens (b. 1985), Belgian ad agency art director and photomontage artist
 (b. 1953), Belgian actor and comedian
Colette Goossens (b. 1942), Belgian swimmer 
Daniel Goossens, (b. 1954), French cartoonist
Dennis Goossens (b. 1993), Belgian gymnast
Ester Goossens (b. 1972), Dutch middle-distance runner
Eugène Goossens, père (1845–1906), Belgian conductor
Eugène Goossens, fils (1867–1958), French conductor and violinist, son of Eugène Goossens, père
Eugene Aynsley Goossens (1893–1962), English conductor and composer, son of Eugène Goossens, fils
 (b. 1930), Belgian dialectologist and philologist
Jan Goossens (b. 1958), Dutch-born American indoor soccer player
Jean-Maurice Goossens (1892–1965), Belgian ice hockey player
John Goossens (b. 1988), Dutch footballer
John J. Goossens (1944–2002), Belgian businessman
Kris Goossens (b. 1974), Belgian tennis player
Léon Goossens (1897–1988), British oboist, son of Eugène Goossens, fils
Marc Goossens (cyclist) (b. 1958), Belgian racing cyclist 
Marc Goossens (b. 1969), Belgian racecar driver
Michaël Goossens (b. 1973), Belgian footballer
Pierre-Lambert Goossens (1827–1906), Belgian Cardinal of the Roman Catholic Church
Ray Goossens (1924–1998), Flemish artist, animator and director
Reinhilde Goossens (b. 1961), Belgian singer known by the name "Lisa del Bo"
Robert Goossens (1927–2016), French jewelry maker
 (born 1937), Belgian comics artist known as "Gos"
Sidonie Goossens (1899–2004), British harpist, daughter of Eugène Goossens, fils
Simon Goossens (1893–1964), Belgian sculptor 
Victor Goossens, founder and co-owner of the multiregional professional esports organization Team Liquid

See also
Goosen, form of surname most common in South Africa
Goossen, another form of the surname
Mount Goossens, named after the Belgian photographer Leon Goossens

References

Surnames of Belgian origin
Dutch-language surnames
Patronymic surnames